The Conference USA Men's Soccer Freshman of the Year is an annual award given to the best freshman soccer player in Conference USA during the NCAA Division I men's soccer season. Several players have gone on to have professional careers. Most notably, Brad Davis and Vedad Ibišević
have represented their countries at the FIFA World Cup.

Freshman of the Year 
 2020: Joe Thacker, Old Dominion
 2019: Milo Yosef, Marshall
 2018: Jason Reyes, Kentucky
 2017: Enrique Facusse, Kentucky
 2016: Kevin Langan, Charlotte
 2015: Niko Klosterhalfen, Old Dominion
 2014: Mikkel Knudsen, South Carolina
 2013: Chris Wehan, New Mexico
 2012: Cristian Mata, Tulsa
 2011: Tony Rocha, Tulsa
 2010: Juan Castillo, SMU
 2009: Daniel Withrow, Marshall
 2008: Austin Neil, Tulsa
 2007: Jimmy Maurer, South Carolina
 2006: Jeff Scanella, South Carolina
 2005: Mike Gustavson, South Carolina
 2004: Rodrigo Hidalgo and Simon Schoendorf, USF
 2003: Vedad Ibišević, Saint Louis
 2002: Hunter West, USF
 2001: Clint Baumstark, UAB
 2000: Brad Davis, Saint Louis
 1999: Flavio Monteiro, UAB
 1998: Kyle Meador, Cincinnati
 1997: Rumba Munthali, UAB
 1996: Erik Kuster, UAB
 1995: Jacob Thomas, Saint Louis

References

External links
 

College soccer trophies and awards in the United States
Conference Usa
Conference USA men's soccer
Awards established in 1995
College sports freshman awards
1995 establishments in the United States